The truffle is the edible body of fungi in the genus Tuber.

Truffle or Truffles may also refer to:
 Chocolate truffle, a chocolate confection
 Truffles (character), a character on Chowder
 Truffles, a Happy Tree Friends character
 "Savoy Truffle", a song by The Beatles
 In programming language implementation, the Truffle interpreter implementation framework, used with GraalVM
 Truffle, the Rhinarium of a canine.

See also
 False truffle, various kinds of hypogeous fungi other than Tuber
 Desert truffle or Terfezia
 Elaphomyces granulatus or hart's truffles, a species of fungus in Elaphomyces